Ahmad Marvi (Persian: احمد مروی) (born: 1958, Mashhad) is an Iranian Twelver Shia cleric, former general and former police officer who has recently been appointed as the custodian of Astan Quds Razavi (Persian: آستان قدس رضوی) by the decree of the supreme leader of Iran, Seyyed Ali Khamenei.
 
Before that, he was in charge of a department at Iranian supreme leader office, responsible for contacts and communications with religious seminaries; and likewise the chief of "Estehlal Headquarters" of the "supreme leader office".

Ahmad Marvi has educated at seminary and university in high levels of fiqh/principles, and Ph.D. in "theology and Islamic education"; and had teachers such as: Seyyed Ali Khamenei, Abolghasem Khazali, Taheri Khoram Abbadi, Hossein Waheed Khorasani and Mojtaba Tehrani. Marvi who is also known as "Hujjatul-Islam Marvi"  replaced Ebrahim Raisi as the new chief custodian and trustee of the Astan Quds Razavi, (which is a charitable organization holding trusteeship of "Imam Reza shrine" in Mashhad) by the order of Ali Khamenei, on 30 March 2019.

References

External links 
 Ayatollah Khamenei appointed Sheikh Ahmad Marvi as the custodian of Astan Quds Razavi

Iranian Shia clerics
Living people
People from Mashhad
1958 births
Iranian individuals subject to the U.S. Department of the Treasury sanctions
Ferdowsi University of Mashad alumni
Iranian police officers
Iranian military chaplains